Forbidden Ground may refer to:

 Forbidden Ground (1968 film)
 Forbidden Ground (2013 film)